Samuel Groth and Toshihide Matsui were the defending champions but decided not to participate.

Krajicek and Sandgren won the title, defeating Ante Pavić and Blaž Rola in the final, 7–6(7–4), 6–3.

Seeds

Draw

Draw

References
 Main Draw

BNP Paribas de Nouvelle-Caledonie - Doubles
Internationaux de Nouvelle-Calédonie